OLS or Ols may refer to:

 Oleśnica (German: Öls), Poland
 Optical landing system
 Order of Luthuli in Silver, a South African honour
 Ordinary least squares, a method used in regression analysis for estimating linear models
 Ottawa Linux Symposium
 Oulun Luistinseura, a Finnish multi-sports club
 The Sims 3: Outdoor Living Stuff, the third stuff pack to The Sims 3
 Nogales International Airport, Arizona, US (IATA code)